The following is a list of Oricon number-one manga of 2016. A chart with the best selling manga in Japan is published weekly by Oricon. This list includes the manga that reached the number one place on that chart in 2016.

Chart history

References 

2016 manga
2016 in comics
2016